In linear algebra, a nilpotent matrix is a square matrix N such that

for some positive integer .

More generally, a nilpotent transformation is a linear transformation  of a vector space such that  for some positive integer  (and thus,  for all ). Both of these concepts are special cases of a more general concept of nilpotence that applies to elements of rings.

Examples

Example 1
The matrix

is nilpotent with index 2, since .

Example 2
More generally, any -dimensional triangular matrix with zeros along the main diagonal is nilpotent, with index  . For example, the matrix

is nilpotent, with

Example 3
Although the examples above have a large number of zero entries, a typical nilpotent matrix does not. For example, 

although the matrix has no zero entries.

Example 4
Additionally, any matrices of the form

such as 

or 

square to zero.

Example 5
Perhaps some of the most striking examples of nilpotent matrices are  square matrices of the form:

The first few of which are:

These matrices are nilpotent but there are no zero entries in any powers of them less than the index.

Example 6
Consider the linear space of polynomials of a bounded degree. The derivative operator is a linear map. We know that applying the derivative to a polynomial decreases its degree by one, so when applying it iteratively, we will eventually obtain zero. Therefore, on such a space, the derivative is representable by a nilpotent matrix.

Characterization

For an  square matrix  with real (or complex) entries, the following are equivalent:
  is nilpotent.
The last theorem holds true for matrices over any field of characteristic 0 or sufficiently large characteristic. (cf. Newton's identities)

This theorem has several consequences, including:
For example, every  nilpotent matrix squares to zero.
 The determinant and trace of a nilpotent matrix are always zero. Consequently, a nilpotent matrix cannot be invertible.
 The only nilpotent diagonalizable matrix is the zero matrix.

See also: Jordan–Chevalley decomposition#Nilpotency criterion.

Classification

This matrix has 1s along the superdiagonal and 0s everywhere else.  As a linear transformation, the shift matrix "shifts" the components of a vector one position to the left, with a zero appearing in the last position:

This matrix is nilpotent with degree , and is the canonical nilpotent matrix.

Specifically, if  is any nilpotent matrix, then  is similar to a block diagonal matrix of the form

where each of the blocks  is a shift matrix (possibly of different sizes).  This form is a special case of the Jordan canonical form for matrices.

For example, any nonzero 2 × 2 nilpotent matrix is similar to the matrix

That is, if  is any nonzero 2 × 2 nilpotent matrix, then there exists a basis b1, b2 such that Nb1 = 0 and Nb2 = b1.

This classification theorem holds for matrices over any field.  (It is not necessary for the field to be algebraically closed.)

Flag of subspaces

A nilpotent transformation  on  naturally determines a flag of subspaces

and a signature

The signature characterizes  up to an invertible linear transformation. Furthermore, it satisfies the inequalities

Conversely, any sequence of natural numbers satisfying these inequalities is the signature of a nilpotent transformation.

Additional properties

Generalizations
A linear operator  is locally nilpotent if for every vector , there exists a  such that

For operators on a finite-dimensional vector space, local nilpotence is equivalent to nilpotence.

Notes

References

External links
 Nilpotent matrix and nilpotent transformation on PlanetMath.

Matrices